The Yevpatoria tram system is a tram system operating in Yevpatoria, in the disputed territory of Crimea.

Routes

Inventory

Fares 
A 1-month pass for an adult costs 1020 rubles, or 510 for a child.

Sources 

Tram transport in Ukraine
Yevpatoria
Metre gauge railways in Ukraine
Town tramway systems by city
1914 establishments in Ukraine